Paramphilius is a genus of loach catfishes found in Africa.

Description
Paramphilius have a lengthened and cylindrical body with a short and high head and short and round fins. The small eyes are located far forward. The barbels are long. The caudal fin is truncated or round. All of the West African species are uniformly brown with a paler underside; P. firestonei also has irregularly distributed brown spots as well as a dark spot at the base of the caudal fin. Paramphilius species exhibit a peculiar form of sexual dimorphism in that the males mature have a more inflated head. Unlike species of Amphilius, the length of the snout is less than half of the length of the head, the adipose fin is confluent with the caudal fin, and the anal fin has seven or more branched rays.

Species 
There are currently four recognized species in this genus:
 Paramphilius baudoni (Pellegrin, 1928)
 Paramphilius firestonei L. P. Schultz, 1942
 Paramphilius teugelsi P. H. Skelton, 1989
 Paramphilius trichomycteroides Pellegrin, 1907

References

Amphiliidae
Fish of Africa
Catfish genera
Taxa named by Jacques Pellegrin
Freshwater fish genera